Four Days in September is a 1997 Brazilian thriller film directed by Bruno Barreto and produced by his parents Lucy and Luiz Carlos Barreto. It is a dramatized version of the 1969 kidnapping of the United States Ambassador to Brazil, Charles Burke Elbrick, by members of Revolutionary Movement 8th October (MR-8) and Ação Libertadora Nacional (ALN).

It was nominated as Best Foreign Language Film at the 1998 Academy Awards.

Background
The film is "loosely based" on the 1979 memoir O Que É Isso Companheiro? (in English: What's It, Mate?), written by politician Fernando Gabeira. In 1969, as a member of Revolutionary Movement 8th October (MR-8), a student guerrilla group, he participated in the abduction of the United States ambassador to Brazil, negotiating to gain release of leftist political prisoners. MR-8 was protesting the recent takeover of Brazil by a military government and seeking the release of political prisoners. But, the military increased its repression of dissent, MR-8 and ALN members were tortured by the police, and democracy was not re-established in Brazil until 1985.

Gabeira later became a journalist and politician, elected as congressman from the Green Party.

Plot
The film is a fictional version of the dramatic events of the abduction of the American ambassador Charles Burke Elbrick (played by Alan Arkin) in 1969. Elbrick was taken in Rio de Janeiro by the Revolutionary Movement 8th October (MR-8) with help of Ação Libertadora Nacional (ALN).  Gabeira (played by Pedro Cardoso and named Paulo in the film) as a student joins the radical movement after the military overthrow of the Brazilian government. He and his comrades, led by Andréia, gradually decided to kidnap the ambassador as a protest, and are shown mostly planning and executing the kidnapping. Paulo is portrayed as "the most intelligent and uncertain of the kidnappers."

The film explores Paulo's love affair with Andréia, the guerrilla leader. It suggests a kind of friendship developing between Paulo and Elbrick. The ambassador is portrayed as a decent man who shares some of his kidnappers' frustrations regarding the Brazilian military dictatorship, but who feels obligated to follow orders he might disagree with.

Cast
The main characters include:
Paulo / Fernando Gabeira (Pedro Cardoso) - member of the MR-8 guerrilla group and one of the kidnappers.
Andréia / Maria (Fernanda Torres) - the beautiful and tough MR-8 guerrilla-group leader who falls in love with Paulo/Fernando.
Charles Burke Elbrick (Alan Arkin) - the American ambassador, who forms a bond with Paulo/Fernando.
Jonas / Virgílio Gomes da Silva (Matheus Nachtergaele) - member of ALN guerrilla group
Marcão / Franklin Martins (Luiz Fernando Guimarães) - second in command to the MR-8 guerrilla group and one of the kidnappers.
Renée / Vera Sílvia Magalhães (Cláudia Abreu) - member of the MR-8 guerrilla group and one of the kidnappers.
Toledo / Joaquim Câmara Ferreira (Nélson Dantas) - member of ALN guerrilla group. He's a Spanish expatriate in Brazil that fought the dictatorship of Francoist Spain
Henrique (Marco Ricca) - former Navy enlistee and member of the National Intelligence Service of Brazil
Brandão (Maurício Gonçalves) - member of the National Intelligence Service of Brazil
Júlio / Cid Benjamin (Caio Junqueira) - member of the MR-8 guerrilla group and one of the kidnappers.
César / Oswaldo (Selton Mello) - member of the MR-8 guerrilla group, arrested prior to the kidnapping of the Ambassador.
Dona Margarida / Elba Souto-Maior (Fernanda Montenegro)
Lília (Alessandra Negrini) - wife of Henrique
Mowinkel (Fisher Stevens)

Reception
The film had mixed reviews, in part because of its fictionalizing Brazilian history, and its uneasy portrayal of terrorist activities by student radicals. Stephen Holden of The New York Times wrote, "Four Days in September is an uneasy hybrid of political thriller and high-minded meditation on terrorism, its psychology and its consequences." He noted that the film suggests the kidnapping was followed by worse political events, with increased repression, and torture of MR-8 members. He describes Cardoso as the most complex character.

Roger Ebert gave it two stars, saying the film was marked by a "quiet sadness" and the "film examines the way that naive idealists took on more than they could handle." He suggests that the film tries to humanize both sides but seems muddled. Ebert writes, "The point of view is that of a middle-age man who no longer quite understands why, as a youth, he was so sure of things that now seem so puzzling."

Awards
Internationally, the film was nominated for many awards, including Best Foreign Language Film by the Academy Awards. Brazil entered it into the 47th Berlin International Film Festival.

See also
 List of submissions to the 70th Academy Awards for Best Foreign Language Film
 List of Brazilian submissions for the Academy Award for Best Foreign Language Film

References

External links
James Berardinelli review: Four Days in September
Four Days in September, BBC

1997 thriller films
1997 films
1990s thriller films
1990s Portuguese-language films
Brazilian thriller films
Films about Brazilian military dictatorship
Films directed by Bruno Barreto
Films set in Brazil
Films set in Rio de Janeiro (city)
Films set in 1969
Films shot in Rio de Janeiro (city)
Films scored by Stewart Copeland
Films about kidnapping
Films about hostage takings
Films about diplomats
Thriller films based on actual events